Jamie Peter Southon (born 13 October 1974) is an English footballer who played as a midfielder.

Career
After joining Southend United's youth academy from Norwich City, Southon made one solitary appearance for Southend, coming in the 1992–93 season. Following his time with Southend, Southon dropped into Non-League football, playing for Purfleet, Stevenage Borough, Dagenham & Redbridge, Grays Athletic before joining Sing Tao in Hong Kong. Upon his return to England, Southon rejoined Grays, before signing for Chelmsford City in November 1996. In July 1997, Southon joined Enfield, leaving the club for Purfleet in September 1997. Over the course of six seasons, Southon made 283 appearances, scoring 22 times. In February 2003, signed for Hornchurch. In June 2005, following the liquidation of Hornchurch, Southon signed for Cambridge City. After 23 appearances in all competitions at Cambridge, Southon joined Chelmsford for a second spell. In 2006, Southon joined Hornchurch's phoenix club AFC Hornchurch.

Southon later played for Essex Olympian League side Kelvedon Hatch.

Jamie is now a first team coach at Hornchurch FC.

References

1974 births
Living people
Association football midfielders
Footballers from Dagenham
English footballers
Southend United F.C. players
Thurrock F.C. players
Stevenage F.C. players
Dagenham & Redbridge F.C. players
Grays Athletic F.C. players
Sing Tao SC players
English expatriate footballers
Expatriate footballers in Hong Kong
English expatriate sportspeople in Hong Kong
Chelmsford City F.C. players
Enfield F.C. players
Hornchurch F.C. players
St Albans City F.C. players
Cambridge City F.C. players
English Football League players